The voiced retroflex lateral approximant is a type of consonantal sound used in some spoken languages.

The retroflex lateral approximant contrasts phonemically with its voiceless counterpart  in Iaai and Toda. In both of these languages it also contrasts with more anterior , which are dental in Iaai and alveolar in Toda.

Features
Features of the voiced retroflex lateral approximant:

Occurrence
In the following transcriptions, diacritics may be used to distinguish between apical  and laminal .

See also
Index of phonetics articles

Notes

References

External links
 

Lateral consonants
Retroflex consonants
Pulmonic consonants
Oral consonants